Muyun Economic Development Zone is an economic development zone at province level in Tianxin District of Changsha City, Hunan Province, China, one of two economic development zones in Tianxin District. It is the original Changsha Muyun Industrial Park created in August 2001. In March 2012, it was renamed to the present name.

Muyun Economic Development Zone is located in the central south of Changsha city proper, on the eastern shore of the Xiang River, it adjoins Tianxin Economic Development Zone to the north and Zhaoshan Demonstration Area of Xiangtan to the south.

References 

Tianxin District
Economy of Changsha
1999 establishments in China